The North Harbour women's field hockey team are an amateur sports team based in New Zealand. The team competes annually in the Ford National Hockey League (NHL).

North Harbour have won the Women's NHL a total of 5 times, last winning the championship in 2019.

Team Roster
The following is the North Harbour team roster for the 2019 Ford NHL:

Team Staff 

Head coach: Sam Bartholomew

Assostant coaches: Elliot Bartholomew and Henry Wong

Team manager: Rachel Williams

Team physiotherapist: Tracey Lydiard

Team List 

Brooke Roberts (GK)
Tori Robinson
Julia Gomes
Kate Ivory
Erin Goad
Mattea Harris
Ella Hyatt-Brown
Josephine Ackroyd
Kathryn Henry
Claudia Hanham
Samantha Polovnikoff
Sophie Rider
Lucia Sanguinetti
Summer Notredame
Kirsten Pearce
Cassandra Reid
Stephanie Dickins
Hattie Jones
Madeleine Forbes (GK)

References

Women's field hockey teams in New Zealand
2000 establishments in New Zealand